Albert Park is a football ground in Hawick in the Scottish Borders, which is the home of Lowland Football League club Hawick Royal Albert F.C.

Football
The ground was opened in 1963 and is located on Mansfield Road in the north-east of the town. It is adjacent to the Mansfield Park rugby union ground, home of Hawick RFC.

Greyhound racing
Albert Park had a short lived greyhound track around the pitch from 13 May 1989 until 1999. The track was a fairly tight circuit, heavily banked and raced over 270, 450 and 630 yards. The greyhound operation closed amidst controversy after a track manager was convicted of animal cruelty after using hares as live bait. Greyhound racing's governing body the Greyhound Board of Great Britain (GBGB) were unable to impose any punishment because the track chose to be independent and was not affiliated to the GBGB.

References 

Football venues in Scotland
Hawick Royal Albert F.C.
Sports venues in the Scottish Borders
Sports venues completed in 1963
1963 establishments in Scotland
Defunct greyhound racing venues in the United Kingdom
Greyhound racing in Scotland
Hawick